Boungou is a village located in Haute-Kotto, Central African Republic. There is diamond mining in the village located on the bank of the Boungou River.

History 
On 17 and 18 February 2020, an ethnic clash between Sara and Goula took place in Boungou. This led the residents to flee the village and take refuge in Bria.

Facilities 
The village has one market, a health center, and a primary school.

References 

Populated places in Haute-Kotto